José Marín Varona (Camagüey, March 10, 1859Havana, September 17, 1912) was a Cuban composer, conductor, pianist and professor.

Biographical note

José Marín Varona was born on March 10, 1859, in the city of Camagüey, where he began his musical studies with professor Mariano Agüero. At a later time, Varona established his residence in Havana.

In 1896, the composer included in his zarzuela "El Brujo" the first Cuban guajira which has been historically documented.

About this piece, composer Eduardo Sánchez de Fuentes said: "The honest critique of a not very far day will bestow the author of the immortal guajira of "El Brujo" the honor to which he is undoubtedly entitled at any time".

Shortly after the premiere of "El Brujo", Marín Varona travelled to the United States because of threats received from the Spanish government because of his support of the Cuban independence movement. During his exile he continued his musical activity and offered presentations with the purpose of collaborating with the national independence cause. In Key West he contributed to the local media with news articles and musical critique.

Upon returning to Cuba, Marín Varona was married to the Spanish singer Amalia Rodríguez and travelled through the Americas with zarzuela and operetta companies. 
In 1913, Cuban composer José Mauri offered a lecture about his work at the National Academy of Arts and Literature; and in 1916, the Infantry Band of the Army recorded four of his caprices called "Tropicales" (Esperanza, Ensueños, Novelita and Íntima) for the VIctor Recording Company.

Professional activity

The work of José Marín Varona links the musical activity of the end of the 19th century and the beginning of the 20th century in Cuba.

After his arrival to Havana at a very young age, Marín Varona worked as a sight singing and piano at the Municipal Conservatory; and after the Republic inauguration, in 1902, he founded the Army Staff (military) Band. In 1905 Marín Varona also organized the Artillery  Band, for which he composed and arranged numerous pieces, such as the Tributo al Maine, Himno para el Yara, Huérfanos de la Patria, Gobernador Magoon and La Independencia, among others.

José Marín Varona created the "Cuba Musical" magazine where he exerted musical critique and published numerous articles about the Havana artistic activity during the first years of the Republic. He also collaborated as a journalist to other local publications. Marín Varona was a professor at the Municipal Conservatory of Havana and a member of National Academy of Arts and Literature, where he participated as President of the Music Section for many years. He also wrote "Complete treatise on music theory".

Marín Varona served for a long time as conductor of the Albisu Theater orchestra along with Spanish conductor Modesto Julián. He also regularly collaborated with the famous Alhambra Theater (since its foundation to 1912), for which he composed pieces such as the zarzuela "La Guaracha". He shared the podium at that venue with Maestro Rafael Palau.

Composer

José Marín Varona was a prolific composer of music that included zarzuelas, romanzas, children music for piano, pot-potpourris and danzas. His work belongs  to the most significant output within the Cuban nationalist movement from the end of the 19th century. The first piece he composed, the "Consuelo" waltz, was created by him when he was just twenty years old.

The "Tropicales" pieces (subtiled tropical caprices) from Marín Varona, which received an award at the Paris Universal Exposition in 1900, were defined as "real concert dances, marked by the end of the Century creole style".

In his songs it is possible to notice a notable relation between elements characteristic of popular music and those of concert music.  "Siempre tú" and "Ilusión" – denominations that correspond to certain "Tropicales" pieces for, voice and piano- show an evident influence from Italian lyric style and the technical melodic difficulties of the operatic aria; while the accompaniment rhythm presents the most popular characteristics of Cuban music. Such treats may be perceived in many other of his pieces. 

José Marín Varona passed away in Havana on September 17, 1912. During the funeral service the Infantry Band interpreted his song "Acuérdate de mí", and that same year the famous Cuban soprano Chalía Herrera recorded some of his works in New York City.

Works
Zarzuelas
 Ábreme la puerta, F. Villoch 
 El 10 de Octubre, décimas, 2V, A. Díaz 
 El alcalde de la Güira, dúo amoroso, J. Robeño 
 El Brujo, J. R. Barreiro
 El hijo de Camagüey, A. del Pozo 
 La guaracha, F. Villoch, 1902 
 La víspera de san Juan, Gua, J. B. Ubago
 Las excursionistas en la Habana, F. Villoch
 Tute arrastrado, M. Zardoya

Himns y marches
 General Rojas;  Gobernador Maggon's, Bnd (Ed. Artillery Corps Printing, 1908)
 Himno de Bayano, Himno invasor, 1899
 Himno para el Yara 
 Hermanos de la Patria
 José de la Luz y Caballero 
 La independencia
 La Paz; Néstor Aranguren 
 The Havana Post
 Tributo al Maine

Voice and piano
 A ti 
 A una mascarita
 Acuérdate de mi
 Amar es la vida 
 Amor y odio
 Anhelos, 1903
 Any Name
 Banquete, concierto y baile 
 Canto de amor 
 Dame un beso
 Desde el mar 
 El desobediente
 El desvalido
 El día
 El dulce beso 
 El estudio
 El libro
 El Maestro
 El mar de Levante, 1912
 El mendigo
 El recuerdo de la infancia
 El veinte de Mayo
 Es el amor la mitad de la vida 
 Ilusión
 In memoriam
 La flor marchita
 La guaracha 
 La oración 
 la puerta de mi Bohío 
 Los caleseros 
 Mi bandera
 Mi dulce amor
 Mi patria 
 Perla de las Antillas 
 Piedad 
 Recuerdos del Bloqueo, rumba
 Serenata criolla
 Siempre tú
 Solo tú
 Tristezas 
 Tu amor es mi aventura
 Tu recuerdo
 Tu canción
 Ven vida mía

Piano
 Ábreme la puerta
 Borincana
 Camagüeyana
 Dulce anhelo 
 En el circo me verás
 Florimel 
 Gitanilla 
 Íntima 
 Juguete español 
 La guajira, danzón 
 La hija de Oriente 
 La Yuquita
 Lola
 Mal de amor 
 Mi niña
 Mignon 
 Misteriosa 
 Nocturno 
 Nostalgia 
 Novelita 
 Page of life
 Para ti
 Petit Minuet 
 Piña mamey y zapote, danzón 
 Por ti, 
 danzón 
 Recuerdo 
 Tú ves como Cuba es libre, danzón

See also 
 Music of Cuba

References

1859 births
20th-century classical composers
20th-century male musicians
Cuban classical composers
Latin music composers
1912 deaths